The Letter is a studio album by Fred Frith's United States experimental rock group Cosa Brava. It was recorded in France in June 2010 and Oakland, California in August 2011, and was released by Intakt Records in Switzerland on March 21, 2012.

Reception

Writing at All About Jazz, John Eyles described The Letter as "transcend[ing] genre", and Frith's songs as "melodic ... provid[ing] the group with plenty of scope for embellishment". He said the album "hangs together well", adding that Kihlstedt's violin has "inflections carrying great emotional weight", and Frith's guitar as "fluid [and] interwoven with wordless vocals, to stunning effect" on "Common Sense".

Track listing

Source: Intakt Records, Discogs

Personnel
Fred Frith – guitar, bass guitar, voice
Carla Kihlstedt – violin, bass harmonica, voice
Zeena Parkins – accordion, keyboards, foley objects, voice
Shahzad Ismaily – bass guitar, voice
Matthias Bossi – drums, percussion, mayhem, vocals
The Norman Conquest – sound manipulation

Guests
Michael Elrod – tambura (track 4)
William Winant – concert bass drum (track 10), crotales (track 2)

Recording and production
Tracks 1, 2, 4, 5, 6, 8, 11, 12 recorded at Chàteau de Faverolles, France, June 1–4, 2010
The Norman Conquest – engineer
Tracks 3, 7, 9, 10 recorded at New Improved Recording, Oakland, California, August 9–11, 2011
The Norman Conquest – engineer
Mixed at Jankowski Soundfabrik, Esslingen, Germany, April 9–11, 2011, July 4–5, 2011, January 31, 2012, February 3, 2012
Peter Hardt – engineer
Mastered at Headless Buddha, Oakland, California, February 10, 2012
Myles Boisen – engineer
Artwork
Heike Liss – cover image
Jonas Schoder – graphic design
Production
Fred Frith – producer
Intakt Records – producer
Source: Intakt Records, Discogs

References

External links
The Letter at Intakt Records
The Letter reviews at Intakt Records

2012 albums
Albums produced by Fred Frith
Cosa Brava albums
Intakt Records albums